Jhoomo Re is the second studio album by the Indian Fusion/Sufi band Kailasa, released in 2007.

Track listing
All songs written by Kailash Kher, except track 4 which is written by Amir Khusro. All music composed by Kailash Kher.

Personnel
 Kailash Kher — Vocals
 Paresh Kamath — Guitars, Keyboards, Backing Vocals
 Naresh Kamath — Bass, Keyboards, Backing Vocals
 Kurt Peters — Drums, Percussions
 Rinku Rajput - Keyboards
 Sanket Athale — Percussions, Vocal Percussions, Backing Vocals
 Sankarshan Kini - Violin, Mandolin
Akhlak Hussain Varsi-[Harmonium]

2007 albums
Kailasa (band) albums